The South Londonderry constituency for the Parliament of Northern Ireland was created in 1929 and continued until the abolition of the Parliament in 1973. All members for the constituency were from the Chichester-Clark family: the first was both the son-in-law of the second and the father of the third.

Dehra Parker had been elected (as Dehra Chichester) for County Londonderry in the 1921 and 1925 elections under the single transferable vote; she became a Dame before the 1953 election. Her grandson James Dawson Chichester-Clark was Prime Minister of Northern Ireland from 1969–1971 and after his resignation was created Baron Moyola in 1971. All three elected members were not only from the same party, but were close relations, as were the penultimate member of the South Londonderry constituency for the Westminster parliament in 1922 and the Westminster MP for Londonderry from 1955 to 1972.

Members of Parliament

Elections

The elections in this constituency took place using the first past the post electoral system.

	

Following the death of Chichester-Clark:

	

	

	

	

	

	

Following the resignation of Parker:

See also
South Londonderry (UK Parliament constituency)

External links
Stormont election results for Londonderry county seats 

Historic constituencies in County Londonderry
Londonderry South
Northern Ireland Parliament constituencies established in 1929
Northern Ireland Parliament constituencies disestablished in 1973